The World Blind Football Championships, formerly the Football-5-a-Side World Championships, were played for the first time in 1998.

IBSA Blind Football World Championships

Men's B1

Men's B2/B3 (partially sighted)

Women's Blind Football World Championships B1/B2/B3 (together)

Blind Football at the IBSA World Games

Men's B1

Men's B2/B3 (partially sighted)

Women's B1
 not yet

Women's B2/B3
 not yet

See also
Blind soccer
Cerebral Palsy International Sports and Recreation Association
International Blind Sports Federation
Paralympic games
Paralympic sports
Paralympic association football
CP football
Amputee football

References

External links
 International Blind Sport Federation - Football 5-a-side

 
Blind sports
Paralympic association football
Parasports world championships
IBSA competitions
Recurring sporting events established in 1998
World championships in football variants